This is a list of National Basketball Association players whose last names begin with P or Q. 

The list also includes players from the American National Basketball League (NBL), the Basketball Association of America (BAA), and the original American Basketball Association (ABA). All of these leagues contributed to the formation of the present-day NBA.

Individuals who played in the NBL prior to its 1949 merger with the BAA are listed in italics, as they are not traditionally listed in the NBA's official player registers.

P
 
Joe Pace
Zaza Pachulia
Robert Pack
Wayne Pack
Gerald Paddio
Scott Padgett
Dana Pagett
Jaysean Paige
Marcus Paige
Fred Paine
Milt Palacio
Togo Palazzi
Bud Palmer
Errol Palmer
Jim Palmer
Trayvon Palmer
Walter Palmer
Kevin Pangos
Andy Panko
Georgios Papagiannis
Kostas Papanikolaou
Jannero Pargo
Jeremy Pargo
Easy Parham
Robert Parish
Med Park
Anthony Parker
Jabari Parker
Smush Parker
Sonny Parker
Tony Parker
Barry Parkhill
Jack Parkinson
Charles Parks
Cherokee Parks
Rich Parks
Jack Parr
Doyle Parrack
Eddie Parry
Charlie Parsley
Bob Parsons
Chandler Parsons
Eric Paschall
Anžejs Pasečņiks
Pete Pasko
Žarko Paspalj
Marty Passaglia
George Pastushok
Joe Patanelli
Myles Patrick
Stan Patrick
Andrae Patterson
George Patterson
Lamar Patterson
Patrick Patterson
Ray Patterson
Ruben Patterson
Steve Patterson
Tom Patterson
Worthy Patterson
Justin Patton
Brandon Paul
Chris Paul
Charlie Paulk
Jerry Paulson
Billy Paultz
Sasha Pavlović
Johnny Pawk
Steve Pawk
Jim Paxson
Jim Paxson, Sr.
John Paxson
John Payak
Adreian Payne
Cameron Payne
Kenny Payne
Tom Payne
Elfrid Payton
Gary Payton
Gary Payton II
Mel Payton
George Pearcy
Henry Pearcy
Oleksiy Pecherov
Wiley Peck
Pete Pederson
Rich Peek
Anthony Peeler
George Peeples
Nikola Peković
Jake Pelkington
Norvel Pelle
Sam Pellom
Mike Penberthy
Jerry Pender
Desmond Penigar
Kirk Penney
Mike Peplowski
Will Perdue
William Perigo
Kendrick Perkins
Sam Perkins
Warren Perkins
Kosta Perović
London Perrantes
Aulcie Perry
Charles Perry
Curtis Perry
Elliot Perry
Reggie Perry
Ron Perry
Tim Perry
Chuck Person
Wesley Person
Alec Peters
Jim Petersen
Loy Petersen
Bob Peterson
Ed Peterson
Mel Peterson
Morris Peterson
Geoff Petrie
Johan Petro
Dražen Petrović
Richard Petruška
Bob Pettit
Jerry Pettway
Tony Peyton
Squint Phares
Roger Phegley
Jack Phelan
Jim Phelan
Derrick Phelps
Mike Phelps
Andy Phillip
Bob Phillips
Eddie Phillips
Gary Phillips
Gene Phillips
Willie Phillips
Bobby Phills
Jack Piana
Eric Piatkowski
Walt Piatkowski
Jamorko Pickett
Paul Pierce
Ricky Pierce
Stan Pietkiewicz
Mickaël Piétrus
John Pilch
Ed Pinckney
Kevinn Pinkney
John Pinone
Theo Pinson
Dave Piontek
Tom Piotrowski
Scottie Pippen
Scotty Pippen Jr.
Charles Pittman
Dexter Pittman
Woody Pitzer
Eric Plahn
Zoran Planinić
Tibor Pleiß
Marshall Plumlee
Mason Plumlee
Miles Plumlee
Gary Plummer
Pavel Podkolzin
Vincent Poirier
Aleksej Pokuševski
Dwayne Polee
Jim Pollard
Scot Pollard
Ralph Polson
Jakob Pöltl
Olden Polynice
John Poncar
Cliff Pondexter
Quincy Pondexter
Shamorie Ponds
Yves Pons
Jordan Poole
David Pope
Mark Pope
Dave Popson
Ben Poquette
Chris Porter
Howard Porter
Jontay Porter
Kevin Porter
Kevin Porter Jr.
Michael Porter Jr.
Otto Porter
Terry Porter
Willie Porter
Bobby Portis
Bob Portman
Kristaps Porziņģis
Johnny Posewitz
Scoop Posewitz
James Posey
Lou Possner
Lavor Postell
John Postley
Vitaly Potapenko
Micah Potter
Leon Powe
Cincy Powell
Dwight Powell
Josh Powell
Kasib Powell
Longie Powell
Myles Powell
Norman Powell
Roger Powell
Alex Poythress
Marlbert Pradd
Erv Prasse
Mike Pratt
Pete Preboske
Paul Pressey
Phil Pressey
Babe Pressley
Dominic Pressley
Harold Pressley
Jason Preston
Steve Previs
A. J. Price
Al Price
Bernie Price
Brent Price
Jim Price
Mark Price
Mike Price
Paul Price
Ronnie Price
Tony Price
Bob Priddy
Pablo Prigioni
Joshua Primo
Taurean Prince
Tayshaun Prince
John Pritchard
Kevin Pritchard
Payton Pritchard
Lorvin Proctor
Cy Proffitt
Laron Profit
Joe Proksa
Gabe Pruitt
Red Pryor
Joel Przybilla
Les Pugh
Roy Pugh
Anthony Pullard
Jacob Pullen
Rodney Purvis
Don Putman
Scoop Putnam

Q

Dave Quabius
Tim Quarterman
Trevelin Queen
Neemias Queta
Bob Quick
Immanuel Quickley
Jim Quinlan
Bart Quinn
Chris Quinn
Brian Quinnett

References
  NBA & ABA Players with Last Names Starting with P and Q @ basketball-reference.com
 NBL Players with Last Names Starting with P and Q @ basketball-reference.com

PB